Just Friends, subtitled The Tenors of Buddy Tate, Nat Simkins, Houston Person, is an album by saxophonists Buddy Tate, Nat Simkins and Houston Person that was released by Muse in 1992.

Track listing 
 "Broadway" (Billy Bird, Teddy McRae, Henri Woode) – 6:39
 "Ellington Medley: Day Dream/In a Sentimental Mood/Sophisticated Lady" (Duke Ellington, Billy Strayhorn/Ellington, Manny Kurtz, Irving Mills/Ellington, Mitchell Parish, Mills) – 7:38
 "Lucaya Blue" (Nat Simkins) – 5:03
 "Ain't Misbehavin'" (Fats Waller, Harry Brooks, Andy Razaf) – 5:58
 "Buddy's Blues" (Buddy Tate) – 7:50
 "Just Friends" (John Klenner, Sam M. Lewis) – 6:48
 "Polka Dots and Moonbeams" (Jimmy Van Heusen, Johnny Burke) – 6:55

Personnel 
Buddy Tate, Nat Simkins, Houston Person – tenor saxophone
Stan Hope – piano   
Major Holley – bass 
Grady Tate – drums

References 

Buddy Tate albums
Houston Person albums
1992 albums
Muse Records albums
Albums recorded at Van Gelder Studio